The Meow Bits is the fourth official release from antifolk music group Elastic No-No Band and their first EP.  It is issued only as a digital download.

It is their first official release to contain cover songs, including a song originated by The Beach Boys and a song by The Beatles.

Tracks 1, 2, and 5 appeared later on the 2010 studio album Fustercluck!!!. Tracks 3 and 4 appeared later on the 2012 compilation album Black No-No's.

Track listing
 "Emotional Tourism"
 "I'd Love Just Once to See You"
 "I Want to Hold Your Hand"
 "Suffering From 7"
 "Hangover Dial"

Credits

Elastic No-No Band
Justin Remer
Toby Goodshank – Guitar, Singing, Meows on "I'd Love Just Once To See You"
Major Matt Mason USA – Finger-snaps on "Emotional Tourism"
Preston Spurlock – Bass on "Emotional Tourism"

Songwriters
Tracks 1, 4, 5 written by Justin Remer
Track 2 written by Brian Wilson and Mike Love
Track 3 written by Lennon–McCartney

References

Elastic No-No Band albums
2008 EPs